Tuluva is the name of the third Dynasty of the Vijayanagara Empire. The dynasty traces its patrilineal ancestry to Tuluva Narasa Nayaka, a powerful warlord from the westerly Tulu speaking region. His son Narasimha Nayaka arranged for the assassination of the weak Narasimha Raya II bringing an end to the rule of the Saluva dynasty. Narasimha Nayaka later assumed the Vijayangara throne as Viranarasimha Raya bringing the Tuluva dynasty to prominence. The dynasty was at its zenith during the rule of Krishnadevaraya, the second son of Tuluva Narasa Nayaka.

History 
A Sanskrit epigraph on the eastern wall of Tirumala temple describes the genealogy of Krishnadevaraya. The first ancestor of the Tuluva lineage to be mentioned is Timmabhupati and his wife Devaki. Timmabhupati is followed by his son Ishvara and consort Bukkamma and then a certain Narasa Bhupala who is none other than Tuluva Narasa Nayaka, the father of Emperor Krishnadevaraya. The powerful warlord Tuluva Narasa Nayaka is attributed with the conquest of the Gajapatis as well as certain Muslim rulers.

Krishnadevaraya a Tulu speaker himself was noted to be linguistically neutral as he ruled a multilingual empire. He is known to have patronised poets and issued inscriptions in languages as varied as Sanskrit, Tamil, Kannada and Telugu. However, he elevated Telugu as a royal language possibly because of the dominance of Telugu speaking chiefs and composed the epic poem Amuktamalyada in it. Tuluva rulers were staunch Vaishnavas and patronised Vaishnavism. Vyasatirtha, a Kannadiga Dvaita saint was the Kulaguru of Krishnadevaraya.

The fall of the Tuluva dynasty led to the beginning of the disintegration of the Vijayanagar empire.

List of rulers

See also 
 Vijayanagar Empire

References

Vijayanagara Empire
Hindu dynasties
Dynasties of India
Tuluva
Tulu Nadu